Herb of grace can refer to several separate plants.

 In Europe, generally another name for rue, Ruta graveolens of the family Rutaceae
 In the USA, usually a name for Bacopa monnieri of the family Plantaginaceae (formerly Scrophulariaceae)
 Sometimes used as a name for Gratiola officinalis